Marrina Smallwood is a fictional character appearing in American comic books published by Marvel Comics. She is a member of Alpha Flight and an honorary member of the Avengers.

Publication history

Marrina first appeared in Alpha Flight #1 (August 1983) and was created by John Byrne. Byrne has clarified that Marrina was created after the Alpha Flight title was green lit, and was not a character he had thought up earlier.

Namor, the Sub-Mariner writer Glenn Herdling said that issue #61 was his favorite of the series, because "I had never been comfortable with how Namor had used the Black Knight's Ebony Blade to slay Marrina, even though she was a mindless leviathan at the time. Being slain by the Ebony Blade is a fate worse than death. The enchanted blade actually traps the souls of its victims in its obsidian void rather than allowing them to roam free to meet their eternal reward. In one fell stroke, Namor had condemned his wife's soul to an eternity of hell. Two years earlier, I had created a character called Bloodwraith, who was the new (and nastier!) wielder of the blade. The connection that Namor had to the Ebony Blade made the Blood Wraith's presence an organic progression of the story rather than a forced guest appearance. In the end, Namor got to free his wife's soul. By redeeming Marrina, he redeemed himself."

Fictional character biography
Marrina is a member of the alien species called the Plodex, which sends its eggs to various planets. When the eggs hatch, young Plodex take the forms of the native species they encounter.

As an egg, Marrina landed in the Atlantic Ocean about 40,000 years ago, at the turn between the Middle Paleolithic and the Upper Paleolithic and remained dormant for thousands of years. This incubation place was responsible for her adaptations to aquatic environments. The egg was found by fisherman Tom Smallwood as he was drowning during a storm. It proved buoyant enough to bring him to the surface and thus save his life. Tom took it home to Newfoundland, Canada. The egg was opened prematurely by his wife Gladys Smallwood, causing Marrina to imprint a humanoid female form. The Smallwoods accepted her as their daughter.

She leaves home at sixteen years of age to join Beta Flight, a team of superheroes trained and funded by the Canadian government. After performing well in Beta Flight, Marrina is promoted to Alpha Flight, although her field duties only begin after the team went freelance. She learns of her alien origin when captured by the Master of the World, and is rescued by Alpha Flight and Namor alongside the Invisible Woman. Following this she leaves Alpha Flight and stays with Namor. Marrina is captured by Attuma, and reverts to savagery for the third time but overcomes it. Marrina marries her lover, Namor. She serves alongside him on Avengers missions and receives honorary membership, and also serves as the queen of Deluvia.

When she becomes pregnant, the Plodex DNA reacts to her condition by turning her into a savage beast in the North Atlantic Ocean, a leviathan. Namor is forced to slay her, impaling her with the Black Knight's enchanted Ebony Blade.

However, Llan the Sorcerer later tells the Master of the World that, "Now she sleeps a false death under the waves." Marrina's body is later seen floating in a tank in the Master's lair.

Marrina resurfaces in Norman Osborn's custody. He uses her as an endgame plan against Namor (who recently betrayed him and allied with the X-Men). Osborn has her D.N.A. spliced and modified, making her a snake-like leviathan, driven by a hunger for Atlantean blood. Once released, Marrina wreaks havoc in the undersea kingdom, injuring and killing many. Eventually Namor drags a weakened Marrina underwater, where he performs a mercy killing.

During the Chaos War storyline, Marrina (alongside Alpha Flight members Guardian, Vindicator, and Shaman) returns from the dead. She joins up with the still-living Alpha Flight members in order to fight the Great Beasts. Marrina remains among the living after the defeat of the Chaos King.

Powers and abilities
Thanks to her genetic structure that is a hybrid combination of Plodex and Earth DNA, Marrina's body is totally amphibious, and she has pale yellow skin, large fish-like eyes, and webbed hands and feet. Possessing both lungs and gills, she can breathe and exist indefinitely on land or under the sea. She is able to withstand freezing temperatures and underwater pressures without harm. Her hydrodynamic proportions, sleek skin, webbed extremities, and superhuman strength aid in her swimming. She can sustain underwater speeds approaching 51 knots (roughly 59 mph) for  several hours and is capable of massive acceleration by shedding the outer layer of her skin to expose a nearly frictionless inner skin layer, allowing her to briefly reach speeds in the  range. She has further demonstrated some ability to control water — in combination with her massive underwater speed, she was able to raise and ride the crest of a huge waterspout, letting her travel from an ocean shore up to three miles inland. After such feats, her outer skin layer can quickly regenerate to normal. Her skin also secretes an oil which can cause extreme constriction of the pupils — with one slap, she was able to temporarily blind the Sub-Mariner, himself superhumanly adapted to underwater existence. On dry land, she can sprint at tremendous speeds.

Although Marrina has a friendly personality, thanks to her upbringing by her foster parents, her mental programming by the Plodex repeatedly emerges from her subconscious mind. Her savage instincts can even be triggered by chemical stimuli given off by other Plodex. When her Plodex DNA takes over, she takes on a more beast-like appearance. Her hands turn into talons that easily cut through most material. Marrina can change shape to an unknown degree under the influence of her savage instincts. During her pregnancy, Marrina resembled a sea serpent and was over a mile in length. She also displayed the ability to discharge eye beams of pure kinetic force while in leviathan form.

Other versions

Exiles
Marrina is also a member of Alpha Flight on Earth 3470, the reality that the Exiles' Heather Hudson is from. She has to reside in a tank of water to participate in Alpha Flight's meetings. She does not demonstrate that she is capable of human speech, but she was shown to have the same ability to create water spouts as her counterpart in the main reality.

House of M
Marrina is briefly featured in House of M #6 during Genosha's celebration of mutantkind's victory over man, alongside Namor.

References

External links
 Marrina at Marvel.com
 "Marrina" entry at Marvel Directory
 "Marrina" entry at Alphanex
 Spotlight on Marrina at UncannyXmen.net
 

Characters created by John Byrne (comics)
Comics characters introduced in 1983
Fictional characters from Newfoundland and Labrador
Fictional characters with water abilities
Fictional mermen and mermaids
Marvel Comics aliens
Marvel Comics characters who can move at superhuman speeds
Marvel Comics characters with superhuman strength
Marvel Comics extraterrestrial superheroes
Marvel Comics female superheroes
Superheroes who are adopted